Ilet Boisseau, or Bushel Island, is an island located near Martinique, as part of the Arrondissement of La Trinité. The island is small, with a total area of 0.054 km2. Ilet Boisseau is a protected area.

References

Landforms of Martinique
Martinique region articles needing translation from French Wikipedia
Canada geography articles needing translation from French Wikipedia